Mawayana (Mahuayana), also known as Mapidian (Maopidyán), is a moribund Arawakan language of northern South America. It used to be spoken by  people living in ethnic Wai-wai and Tiriyó villages in Brazil, Guyana and Suriname. As of 2015, the last two speakers of the language are living in Kwamalasamutu.

Classification 
 lists Mawayana (and possibly Mawakwa as a dialect) together with Wapishana under a Rio Branco (North-Arawak) branch of the Arawakan family.  notes that Mawayana "is closely related to Wapishana" and according to  they share at least 47% of their lexicon.

Phonology 
The vowel systems contains four vowels, each of which has a nasalised counterpart.

Consonants

Vowels
Mawayana vowel phonemes:

Vowels have both nasal and length contrast.

Morphology
{| class="wikitable" 
|+ Mawayana personal affixes:
! 
! singular
! plural
|-
! 1
| n-/m- -na
| wa- -wi
|-
! 2
| ɨ-/i- -i
| ɨ- -wiko
|-
! 3
| ɾ(ɨ/iʔ)- -sɨ
| na- -nu
|-
! 3 refl.
| a-
| 
|}

{| class="wikitable"
|+ Mawayana verbal affixes:
| thematic || -ta, -ɗa, -ɓa
|-
| present || -e
|-
| reciprocal || -(a)ka
|-
| adjectival || -ɾe, -ke
|}

Morphosyntax 
Mawayana has a polysynthetic morphology, mainly head-marking and with suffixes, although there are pronominal prefixes. The verbal arguments are indexed on the verb through subject suffixes on intransitive verbs, while agent prefixes and object suffixes on transitive verbs .

Notes

References

External links 
 The Last of the Mawayana by Unravel magazine

Arawakan languages
Languages of Suriname
Endangered Arawakan languages